Alfred Henry Hearnden (19 January 1874 – 23 October 1951) was an Australian rules footballer who played for the Carlton Football Club in the Victorian Football League (VFL).

Notes

External links 
		
Alf Hearnden's profile at Blueseum

1874 births
1951 deaths
Australian rules footballers from Victoria (Australia)
Carlton Football Club players